Smykovo is a rural locality (a village) in Mayskoye Rural Settlement, Vologodsky District, Vologda Oblast, Russia. The population was 5 as of 2002. There are 3 streets.

Geography 
Smykovo is located 11 km northwest of Vologda (the district's administrative centre) by road. Kovyliovo is the nearest  locality. Creek Mesha []

References 

Rural localities in Vologodsky District